The 2019 Inter-Provincial Trophy was the seventh edition of the Inter-Provincial Trophy, a Twenty20 cricket competition played in Ireland. It was held from 22 June to 18 August 2019. It was the third edition of the competition to be played with full Twenty20 status. The competition was split into two halves, each branded as a T20 Festival. The first half was played in June, and the second half was played in August. Leinster Lightning were the defending champions.

Following the conclusion of the June festival, Northern Knights had won all three of their matches, however, two matches were abandoned due to rain. All of the matches in the August festival were abandoned due to rain, with no play taking place across all three days. As a result, the Northern Knights won the tournament.

Points table
The following teams competed:

Fixtures

June festival
The following fixtures for the June festival were confirmed by Cricket Ireland:

August festival
The following fixtures for the August festival were confirmed by Cricket Ireland:

References

External links
 Series home at ESPN Cricinfo

Inter
Inter-Provincial Trophy seasons